"Xekina Mia Psaropoula"  is a  Greek folkloric tune (Syrtos). Its music was composed and lyrics written by Dimitris Gogos.

See also
Armenaki
Lygaria

References

Greek songs
Cypriot songs
Songwriter unknown
Year of song unknown